Emerald Valley Public School is situated on Yercaud foothills at Salem, Tamil Nadu, India. It is affiliated to Central Board of Secondary Education. It is a co-education school. This school provides special coaching for differently abled children. There was a grand festival named "Sutram 2013" -around 100 schools from Salem were invited. It is a school where a lot of cultural activities meet western events such as MUNs.

High schools and secondary schools in Tamil Nadu
Education in Salem district